James Robert Wood (born 8 September 1985) is a South African cricketer.  Wood is a right-handed batsman who fields as a wicket-keeper.  He was born in Cape Town, Cape Province.

While studying for his degree at Durham University, Wood made his first-class debut for Durham UCCE against Durham in 2005.  He made five further first-class appearances for the university, the last of which came against Lancashire in 2007.  In his six first-class matches, he scored 170 runs at an average of 15.45, with a high score of 31.  Behind the stumps he took 2 catches and made a single stumping.

References

External links
James Wood at ESPNcricinfo
James Wood at CricketArchive

1985 births
Living people
Cricketers from Cape Town
Alumni of Durham University
South African cricketers
Durham MCCU cricketers
Wicket-keepers